Netrin receptor UNC5C is a protein that in humans is encoded by the UNC5C gene.

This gene product belongs to the UNC-5 family of netrin receptors. Netrins are secreted proteins that direct axon extension and cell migration during neural development. They are bifunctional proteins that act as attractants for some cell types and as repellents for others, and these opposite actions are thought to be mediated by two classes of receptors. The UNC-5 family of receptors mediate the repellent response to netrin; they are transmembrane proteins containing 2 immunoglobulin (Ig)-like domains and 2 type I thrombospondin motifs in the extracellular region.

References

Further reading